The Mpopoma is a seasonal river in western Zimbabwe, a tributary of the Kame (Khami River).

The Mpopoma flows through the city of Bulawayo and has been noted for waste oil pollution there.

Notes

Rivers of Zimbabwe